Enotobong "Eno" Benjamin (born April 13, 1999) is an American football running back for the New Orleans Saints of the National Football League (NFL). He played college football at Arizona State and was drafted by the Cardinals in the seventh round of the 2020 NFL Draft.

Early years
Benjamin attended Wylie East in Wylie, Texas. During his high school career, he rushed for 7,546 yards and 111 touchdowns. Benjamin originally committed to the University of Iowa to play college football but changed to Arizona State University.

College career
As a true freshman at Arizona State in 2017, Benjamin would play in 10 games, totaling 23 carries for 142 yards and a touchdown. Benjamin also contributed to special teams as a punt returner in 2017, totaling 119 return yards.

During his sophomore season in 2018, he broke the school record for rushing yards in a game with 312.  Following his junior year where he rushed for 1,083 yards and 10 touchdowns, Benjamin decided to forgo his senior year and declared for the 2020 NFL Draft.

Statistics

Professional career

Arizona Cardinals
Benjamin was selected by the Arizona Cardinals with 222nd overall pick in the seventh round of the 2020 NFL Draft. He was inactive for every game as a rookie.

Benjamin entered the 2021 season third on the Cardinals depth chart behind Chase Edmonds and James Conner. Filling in for Edmonds in Week 9, Benjamin scored his first NFL rushing touchdown against the San Francisco 49ers. He finished the season with 118 yards and a touchdown through nine games. On November 14, 2022, he was released by the Cardinals after 11 weeks of the 2022 season.

Houston Texans
On November 15, 2022, the Houston Texans claimed Benjamin off waivers. He was released on December 13, 2022.

New Orleans Saints
On December 14, 2022, the New Orleans Saints claimed Benjamin off waivers.

References

External links
Arizona Cardinals bio
Arizona State Sun Devils bio

1999 births
Living people
21st-century African-American sportspeople
African-American Christians
African-American players of American football
American Christians
American football running backs
Arizona Cardinals players
Arizona State Sun Devils football players
Houston Texans players
New Orleans Saints players
People from Wylie, Texas
Players of American football from Texas
Sportspeople from the Dallas–Fort Worth metroplex